Gakken can refer to:

Gakken, Japanese publishing company
Gakken EX-System series of educational electronics kits produced by Gakken in the late 1970s
Keihanna Gakken Toshi, as known as Kansai Science City in Japan
Gakken Nara-Tomigaoka Station, train station on the Kintetsu Keihanna Line in Nara, Nara Prefecture, Japan
Gakken Kita-Ikoma Station, train station on the Kintetsu Keihanna Line in Ikoma, Nara Prefecture, Japan.
Keizo Dohi (1866 – 1931), pseudonym Gakken, Japanese dermatologist and urologist